Kristian Benkő (born 3 June 1994) is a Swedish professional footballer who plays for Lombard-Pápa TFC.

Club statistics

Updated to games played as of 6 December 2014.

References
Profile at MLSZ 
Profile at HLSZ 

1994 births
Living people
Footballers from Malmö
Swedish people of Hungarian descent
Swedish footballers
Association football midfielders
Rákospalotai EAC footballers
Lombard-Pápa TFC footballers
Nemzeti Bajnokság I players